Fo Tan Village is a village in the Fo Tan area of Sha Tin District in Hong Kong.

Administration
Fo Tan Village a recognized village under the New Territories Small House Policy.

See also
 Kau Yeuk (Sha Tin)
 Sui Wo (constituency)

References

External links

 Delineation of area of existing village Fo Tan (Sha Tin) for election of resident representative (2019 to 2022)

Villages in Sha Tin District, Hong Kong
Fo Tan